Argyrotaenia magnuncus is a species of moth of the family Tortricidae. It is found in Ecuador (Cotopaxi Province, Azuay Province).

The wingspan is about 17 mm. The ground colour of the forewings is brown with a slight grey admixture and numerous creamish and blackish dots and ill-defined grey-brown markings. The hindwings cream.

Etymology
The species name refers to the size of the uncus and is derived from Latin magnus (meaning large).

References

Moths described in 2008
magnuncus
Moths of South America